Dingo is a Finnish rock band formed around 1982. Their style fused Finnish melancholy with catchy rock melodies. The band was led by the frontman Pertti Neumann (also known as Pertti Nieminen). For a few years at its peak, Dingo was one of the most popular Finnish rock bands and caused a phenomenon called "Dingomania" all over Finland.

Dingo's number one hit was "Autiotalo" from 1984, also released in English as "The House without a Name". A separate youth culture was formed in Finland, known as the Dingoes. Their success, however, was short-lived, and Dingo broke up in October 1986. The band regrouped in 1998 and continues to perform occasionally. The band has sold over 500,000 records in Finland.

Dingo has also released the songs "Tell Me Now" (1986) and "Tobacco Road" (1986) in English.

Biography

1980s 
Dingo was formed in 1982. Through different phases it reached its permanent line-up and sent a demo to a number of labels including Finnlevy and Poko Rekords. Poko Rekords rejected the demo and there has been a rumour that the demo "accidentally" ended up in the wrong drawer. On the other hand, it took only one song to convince Finnlevy, "Hölmöläisten laiva". The demo also contained the band's later hit "Sinä ja minä".

Dingo recorded their first album Nimeni on Dingo before they started playing live gigs. The album sold well right from the beginning, though the band was initially in the shadow of another popular band from Pori, Yö, whose debut album Varietee had sold over 60,000 copies and instantly become number 1 on various charts. However, "Nimeni on Dingo" also went on to become a number one album and eventually outsold Yö's debut album. Hits on Dingo's debut album included Sinä ja minä, Levoton Tuhkimo, Lakatut varpaankynnet and Pistoolisankari.

Dingo's success brought them a lot of fans. In the public, Dingo became known as a band for teenage girls, who screamed and cried of happiness seeing their idols live. The blonde frontman Neumann was especially idolized tremendously, causing controversy in the rock circles.

After Eve left the band and replaced by Pepe at the end of 1984, the new single "Autiotalo" was released. The single climbed to the number one position on every chart and the band reached even greater fame. Dingo was no longer considered to be a band for teenage girls only, and they found fame among older people, including the teenagers' parents.

By the time their next album Kerjäläisten valtakunta was published in 1985, the number of pre-orders reached the amount of a Finnish gold record (over 50 000 copies). The album remained as a number one for three to four months and in the end sold around 190 000 copies. Every song on the album became a hit, especially the single "Kirjoitan". It can be said that Dingo became an all time number one in all aspects: fame, hysteria, sales, media value and the impact on Finnish rock music at the time. They influenced several different Finnish bands and musicians such as Pyhät Nuket (the hit Enkelit sulkivat silmänsä), SIG and Pave Maijanen.

The year 1984 was the year of the "Dingo fever". It was no longer a question of rock music alone, but a sociologically interesting phenomenon as well. Dingo was not only a rock band but also a corporation. The band members were seen on TV programs and on magazine covers.

Neumann's philosophical preferences, the conscious avoiding of publicity and several trips to Ireland started to alienate Dingo's younger audience. Yet Neumann's solo single "Mennään hiljaa markkinoille" and the expectations of a new Dingo single kept the band in headlines. Finally in November 1985 "Kunnian kentät" was released, once again hitting a number one position in the chart. A new Dingo album was expected to be released at Christmas 1985, but Dingo chose have a huge and expensive tour around the country.

The year 1986 was the year of international dance music. Finland also had its own popular dance music group in the form of Bogart Co. Also, the album Kahdeksas ihme by Eppu Normaali reminded that there is excellent Finnish rock music other than Dingo. After a period of silence Dingo released their new album Pyhä klaani, which did not turn out to be as successful as their earlier albums. "Koulukapina", "Kreivin sormus" and "Suru tahtoo sua" from the album were radio hits. "Pyhä klaani" also became a number 1, but the album only sold 80,000 copies, due to changes in Neumann's musical style and especially his lyrics.

Around this time, Dingo had aspirations to release singles in English. The English version of "Autiotalo" (The house without a name) and the B-side, the English version of "Kirjoitan" (Tell me now) were not successful outside Finland. The next single released in Finnish was "Juhannustanssit" ("the Midsummer Dance"), released around the Midsummer time in 1986. This single was a wild rock song that pleased rock critics more than the general audience. 

When the fans gathered in Nivala, Tuiskula in the autumn of 1986, they were shocked by the news of their favourite band falling apart. In Nivala, Pete on the keyboards was replaced by Tumppi, who only had time to perform in the band for a few weeks.

From the remains of the Dingo members, a band called S.E.X was formed. The journey of S.E.X remained rather short, releasing only a few singles: "Uuden aamun kitarat", "Canada", and arguably "Vierivä kivi" sung by Pepe. They also released and "S.E.X" in a rather posthumous spirit.

1990s 
There were rumours of Dingo getting back together in 1990 and 1991, but only after publishing the compilation album Tuhkimotarina. In 1993, the band reunited to record a new song, "Perjantai", for the compilation album Sinä ja minä. Finally, in the spring of 1994 a whole new studio album, Via Finlandia, was released. The most popular songs on the album were "Elämäni sankari" and "Nähdään taas". Dingo also went on tour with Pave Maijanen on the keyboards. The band soon split up again, despite Via Finlandia had selling tens of thousands of copies.

2000s 
Dingo has continued to release new material in the 2000s, including the single "Musta leski" in June 2005 and a whole album in the end of 2005. The band has continued to tour in a variety of line-ups, playing a combination of both the band's old and new music.

Discography 
{| class="toccolours"  border="1" cellpadding="2" cellspacing="0" style="float: right; margin: 0 0 0.5em 0.5em; border-collapse: collapse; border: 1px solid #e2e2e2;"
|+ style="font-size: larger;" | 'Line-ups
|-
! style="background-color: #e7ebee;" | Original line-up (1982–1983)
|
 Pertti Neumann – vocals/bass guitar
 Jonttu Virta – lead guitar
 Juha Seittonen – drums
|-
! style="background-color: #e7ebee;" | (1983)
|
 Pertti Neumann – vocals
 Jonttu Virta – lead guitar
 Jarkko Eve – bass guitar/vocals
 Tuomo Vähä-Pesola – keyboards
 Juha Seittonen – drums
|-
!  style="background-color: #e7ebee;" | Line-up on debut album (11/1983–7/1984)
|
 Pertti Neumann – vocals
 Jonttu Virta – lead guitar
 Jarkko Eve – bass guitar/vocals
 Pete Nuotio – keyboards
 Juha Seittonen – drums
|-
!  style="background-color: #e7ebee;" | Most famous line-up ("the famous five")(7/1984–7/1986)
|
 Pertti Neumann – vocals
 Jonttu Virta – lead guitar
 Pepe Laaksonen – bass guitar/vocals
 Pete Nuotio – keyboards
 Juha Seittonen – drums
|-
!  style="background-color: #e7ebee;" | (7/1986–10/1986)
|
 Pertti Neumann – vocals
 Jonttu Virta – lead guitar
 Pepe Laaksonen – bass guitar/vocals
 Tuomo Vähä-Pesola – keyboards
 Juha Seittonen – drums
|-
!  style="background-color: #e7ebee;" | (10/1986–6/1993)
|
Band was broken.
|-
!  style="background-color: #e7ebee;" | (6/1993–8/1994)
|
 Pertti Neumann – vocals
 Jonttu Virta – lead guitar
 Pepe Laaksonen – bass guitar/vocals
 Pave Maijanen – keyboards
 Juha Seittonen – drums
|-
!  style="background-color: #e7ebee;" | (8/1994–10/1998)
|
Band was broken.
|-
!  style="background-color: #e7ebee;" | Most famous line-up (reunion)(10/1998–1/2002)
|
 Pertti Neumann – vocals
 Jonttu Virta – lead guitar
 Pepe Laaksonen – bass guitar/vocals
 Pete Nuotio – keyboards
 Juha Seittonen – drums
|-
!  style="background-color: #e7ebee;" | (1/2002–12/2002)
|
Band was broken.
|-
!  style="background-color: #e7ebee;" | (31 December 2002)
|
 Pertti Neumann – vocals
 Jari Nieminen – lead guitar
 Jarkko Eve – bass guitar/vocals
 Pekka Kuorikoski – keyboards
 Vesa Aaltonen – drums
|-
!  style="background-color: #e7ebee;" | (1/2003–6/2004)
|
Band was broken.
|-
!  style="background-color: #e7ebee;" | (6/2004–5/2005)
|
 Pertti Neumann – vocals
 Hombre Lampinen – lead guitar
 Jarkko Eve – bass guitar/vocals
 Sami Välimäki – keyboards
 Juha Jokinen – drums
|-
!  style="background-color: #e7ebee;" | (5/2005–3/2007)
|
 Pertti Neumann – vocals
 Erik Valkama – lead guitar
 Jarkko Eve – bass guitar/vocals
 Pekka Siistonen – keyboards
 Ari Toikka – drums
|-
!  style="background-color: #e7ebee;" | (3/2007–6/2007)
|
 Pertti Neumann – vocals
 Erik Valkama – lead guitar
 Jarkko Eve – bass guitar/vocals
 Pekka Siistonen – keyboards
 Jukka Mänty-Sorvari – drums
|-
!  style="background-color: #e7ebee;" | (6/2007–12/2007)
|
 Pertti Neumann – vocals
 Erik Valkama – lead guitar
 Jarkko Eve – bass guitar/vocals
 Robert Engstrand – keyboards
 Jukka Mänty-Sorvari – drums
|-
!  style="background-color: #e7ebee;" | (1/2008–7/2008)
|
 Pertti Neumann – vocals
 Erik Valkama – guitar
 Jarkko Eve – bass guitar/vocals
 Robert Engstrand – keyboards
 Ville Siuruainen – drums
|-
!  style="background-color: #e7ebee;" |  (8/2008–11/2011)
|
 Pertti Neumann – vocals
 Erik Valkama – lead guitar
 Vesa Kuhlman – bass guitar
 Robert Engstrand – keyboards
 Ville Siuruainen – drums
|-
!  style="background-color: #e7ebee;" | (11/2011–9/2014)
|
 Pertti Neumann – vocals
 Erik Valkama – lead guitar
 Vesa Kuhlman – bass guitar
 Jani Hölli – keyboards
 Ville Siuruainen – drums
|-
!  style="background-color: #e7ebee;" | (9/2014–12/2014)
|
Hiatus
|-
!  style="background-color: #e7ebee;" | (12/2014–10/2015)
|
 Pertti Neumann – vocals
 Janne Kasurinen / Mikko Virta – electric guitar
 Esa Nummela – acoustic guitar, backing vocals
 Topi Karvonen – bass guitar
 Jere Ijäs – keyboards, backing vocals
 Tero Rikkonen – drums, backing vocals
|-
!  style="background-color: #e7ebee;" | (10/2015–2016)
|
 Pertti Neumann – vocals
 Rein T. Rebane – lead guitar
 Taago Daniel – bass guitar
 Petri Lapintie – keyboards
 Vallo Vildak – drums
|-
!  style="background-color: #e7ebee;" | One concert (10/2016)
|
 Pertti Neumann – vocals
 Tom Eklund – lead guitar
 Matti Kankkonen – guitar
 Simo Kuusela – bass guitar
 Petteri Parkkila – keyboards
 Otto Haapanen – drums
|-
!  style="background-color: #e7ebee;" | Most famous line-up (reunion)(2/2017–12/2017)
|
 Pertti Neumann – vocals
 Jonttu Virta – lead guitar
 Pepe Laaksonen – bass guitar/vocals
 Pete Nuotio – keyboards
 Juha Seittonen – drums
|-
!  style="background-color: #e7ebee;" |  Current (2/2018)
|
 Pertti Neumann – vocals
 Jonttu Virta – lead guitar
 Pepe Laaksonen – bass guitar/vocals
 Leena Peisa – keyboards
 Saska Ketonen – drums
|}

 Studio albums 
 Nimeni on Dingo (1984)
 Kerjäläisten valtakunta (1985)
 Pyhä klaani (1986)
 Via Finlandia (1994)
 Purppuraa (2005)
 Humisevan harjun paluu (2008)

 Videos/DVDs 
 Nimemme on Dingo (1984, VHS)
 Kerjäläisten valtakunnassa (1985, VHS)
 Dingo Live (1999, VHS)
 Dingomania (2004, DVD)

 Tributes 
 Melkein vieraissa – Nimemme on Dingo'' (2008)

Compilation albums 
 Tuhkimotarina (1993)
 Sinä & Minä (1993)
 20 suosikkia – Autiotalo (1997)
 Parhaat (1999) (2CD)
 Dingomania (2004) (2CD)
 Tähtisarja – 30 suosikkia (2006) (2CD)
 Kunnian päivät 1983–1986 (2006) (3CD+DVD box)
 Sound Pack 2CD+DVD (2010) (2CD+DVD)
 Autiotalon aarteet (2017)

Band members

Current members 
 Pertti Neumann – 1982-
 Jonttu Virta – guitar 1982–2002 and 2017–
 Pepe Laaksonen – bass guitar 1984–2002, 2017–
 Leena Peisa – keyboardist 2018-
 Saska Ketonen – drums 2018-

Former members 
 Jonttu Virta – lead guitar 1982–2002
 Juha "Quuppa" Seittonen – drums 1982–2002
 Jarkko Eve – bass guitar 1983–1984 and 2002–2008
 Tuomo Vähä-Pesola – keyboards 1983, 1986
 Pete Nuotio – keyboards 1983–1986 and 1998–2002
 Pepe Laaksonen – bass guitar 1984–2002
 Pave Maijanen – keyboards 1993–1994
 Jari Nieminen – lead guitar 2002
 Vesa Aaltonen – drums 2002
 Pekka Kuorikoski – keyboards 2002
 Hombre Lampinen – lead guitar 2004–2005
 Juha Jokinen – drums 2004–2005
 Sami Välimäki – keyboards 2004–2005
 Erik Valkama – lead guitar 2005–2014
 Ari Toikka – drums 2005–2007
 Pekka Siistonen – keyboards 2005–2007
 Jukka Mänty-Sorvari – drums 2007
 Robert Engstrand – keyboards 2007–2011
 Vesa Kuhlman – bass guitar 2008–2014
 Ville Siuruainen – drums 2008–2014
 Jani Hölli – keyboards 2011–2014
 Janne Kasurinen / Mikko Virta – electric guitar 2014–2015
 Esa Nummela – acoustic guitar, backing vocals 2014–2015
 Topi Karvonen – bass guitar 2014–2015
 Jere Ijäs – keyboards, backing vocals 2014–2015
 Tero Rikkonen – drums, backing vocals 2014–2015
 Rein T. Rebane – lead guitar 2015–2016
 Taago Daniel – bass guitar 2015–2016
 Petri Lapintie – keyboards 2015–2016
 Vallo Vildak – drums 2015–2016

See also 
List of best-selling music artists in Finland

References

External links 
 Official website
 
 

Finnish rock music groups
Musical groups from Pori
Warner Records artists